C band may refer to:
 C band (IEEE), a radio frequency band from 4 to 8 GHz
 C band (infrared), an infrared band from 1530 to 1565 nm (roughly 200 THz)
 C band (NATO), a radio frequency band from 500 MHz to 1 GHz
 C-banding, in genetics